Events from the year 1695 in the Kingdom of Scotland.

Incumbents 
 Monarch – William II
 Secretary of State – John Dalrymple, Master of Stair (until dismissed after Glencoe enquiry), jointly with James Johnston

Law officers 
 Lord Advocate – Sir James Stewart
 Solicitor General for Scotland – ??

Judiciary 
 Lord President of the Court of Session – Lord Stair (died in November)
 Lord Justice General – Lord Lothian
 Lord Justice Clerk – Lord Ormiston

Events 
 2 July – 1 September – Scottish regiments are involved in the Siege of Namur
 17 July – Parliament passes the act to establish the Bank of Scotland
 Carron Bridge built

Births 
 1 August – John Rutherford, physician and professor at the University of Edinburgh Medical School (died 1779)
 5 October – John Glas, clergyman who started the Glasite church movement (died 1773)
 4 November – John Erskine of Carnock, jurist and professor of Scottish law at the University of Edinburgh (died 1768)
 date unknown –
 John Hay, 4th Marquess of Tweeddale, nobleman, politician, Secretary of State for Scotland, Governor of Bank of Scotland (died 1772)

Deaths 
 13 April – James Drummond bishop (born 1629)
 15 May – Patrick Lyon, 3rd Earl of Strathmore and Kinghorne, peer, (born 1643)
 29 November – James Dalrymple, 1st Viscount of Stair, lawyer and statesman, (born 1619)
 date unknown –
 William Douglas, 1st Duke of Queensberry, politician (born 1637)

See also 
 Timeline of Scottish history

References 

 
Years of the 17th century in Scotland
1690s in Scotland